Fairview Heights is a St. Louis MetroLink station. This station is located on the western edge of Fairview Heights, Illinois and is primarily a commuter station with 853 park and ride spaces and 45 long-term spaces. The station is a large transfer for Illinois MetroBus routes and is the eastern terminus of the Blue Line.

The station and its adjoining transit center are located at the intersection of St. Clair Avenue and Illinois Route 161.

Fairview Heights is the northernmost station served by the St. Clair County Transit District's MetroBikeLink shared-use path system. This  section opened in 2019 and follows the old CSX rail alignment and Schoenberger Creek through hills and hollers of the Dutch Hollow area of Belleville and Fairview Heights.

Station layout

References

External links
 St. Louis Metro

St. Clair County Transit District
MetroLink stations in St. Clair County, Illinois
Railway stations in the United States opened in 2001
Red Line (St. Louis MetroLink)
Blue Line (St. Louis MetroLink)